Ozamiz, officially the City of Ozamiz, is a 3rd class component city in the province of Misamis Occidental, Philippines. According to the 2020 census, it has a population of 140,334 people.

Although occasionally spelled as Ozamis in official sources like COMELEC, it is spelled as Ozamiz in Republic Act No. 321, the Ozamiz City Charter Act. In 2005, City Resolution 251-05 was passed to reiterate that it is officially spelled Ozamiz, not Ozamis.

History

The city of Ozamiz grew out of an old Spanish town called Misamis—a name believed to have been derived from the Subanen word "Kuyamis," a variety of coconut. Other unverified historical sources, however, suggest that the name Misamis came from "Misa" after the Catholic Mass. The old Spanish town grew in size due to the nearby Spanish garrison stationed at the stone fort named Fuerte de la Concepcion del Triunfo. The fort was constructed some time in 1756 in order to attempt to combat the pirate activities originating in the nearby Lanao area. In 1850, the town of Misamis became the capital of the District of Misamis.

In October 1942, Wendell Fertig established the command headquarters of the growing guerrilla resistance to the Japanese occupation of Mindanao in the Spanish fort in the city. His headquarters was abandoned June 26, 1943, due to a large Japanese attack. Until the end of the war, the Japanese occupied this fort. During the Japanese occupation of Misamis in World War II, the "Cotta" was garrisoned by a contingent of Japanese who dug foxholes near or under the walls. This undermining of walls later led to the destruction of the southwest bastion in the earthquake of 1955.

After the war, Misamis became a chartered city by virtue of Republic Act 321 on July 16, 1948. This also renamed Misamis to Ozamiz after a hero José Ozámiz who hailed from the province of Misamis Occidental and who at one time also served as its governor and congressional representative of the Lone District of Misamis Occidental, a delegate to the 1935 Constitutional Convention that resulted in the creation of the 1935 Constitution for the Philippine Commonwealth Government. In 1941, José Ozámiz was elected to the Philippine Senate.

Geography 
Ozamiz is nearby the Zamboanga del Sur and Zamboanga del Norte provinces, while Lanao del Norte is across the bay.

Climate

Barangays
Ozamiz is politically subdivided into 51 barangays.

Demographics

Economy

Ozamiz is agricultural by resource, but it has become the center for commerce, health, transportation, and education, considering its strategic location. The city has a good harbor location, as its local port is the principal outlet of mineral deposits and agricultural and forest products of the provinces of Misamis Occidental, Zamboanga del Norte, Zamboanga del Sur, Maguindanao, parts of Lanao del Norte, and Lanao del Sur.

Retail
Due to the location of the city, Ozamiz has several notable shopping centers within its city center.

 Gaisano Capital Mall is the largest mall in the city with the expansion of a new South Wing Mall in 2011. 
 Novo also expanded and constructed their a larger structure with a hotel named Asia Novotel in 2010.
 Unitop Ozamiz also expanded their building in 2012 in front of the City Public Mall.
 City Public Mall, formerly known as City Public Market, is the biggest public establishment in Northwestern Mindanao. It is owned and managed by the Ozamiz government and was opened on May 28, 2009.
 Robinsons Supermarket opened to the public on November 30, 2012.
 Puregold Ozamiz opened in the year 2019 with the first-ever 7-Eleven serving the developing city.

Government
Local officials are elected every 3 years. The city local government is composed of the mayor, vice mayor, ten councilors, one Sangguniang Kabataan (SK) representative, one indigenous people (IPMR) representative and an Association of Barangay Captains (ABC) representative.

Elected officials

Culture

Notable events and festivals
Ozamiz's Charter Day anniversary, the feast of Our Lady of Triumph of the Cross at Cotta Shrine, and the Subayan Keg Subanon festival are celebrated on July 16. During feasts and holidays, firework displays are held nearby the Cotta Shrine. Every December 8, the Feast of Our Lady of Immaculate Conception is celebrated. The Sr. Santo Nino Fluvial Parade, held at Panguil Bay is celebrated every 4th Sunday of January.

Tourism

 Fuerte de la Concepcion y del Triunfo, also known as Cotta Shrine, is a fort built in 1756 by Father José Ducos to serve as a Spanish outpost in the area. A special chapel was built inside the walls of the fort and an image of the Virgin of the Immaculate Conception was enshrined in the chapel. An image of the Virgin Mary (Nuestra Señora de la Immaculada Concepción y del Triunfo de la Cruz de Migpangi) was carved on the outside wall of the fort facing the sea. The image is believed to be miraculously growing and has been an object of pilgrimage. In 2022, the fort was renovated and restored to its original design. As of now, Cotta is undergoing development with construction of a boulevard with a Spanish galleon replica, a park, a mini commercial complex for food stalls, ticketing offices, restos, cafes and souvenir shops.
 Bukagan Hill has a view of the city, Panguil Bay, and the provinces of Lanao del Norte, and Zamboanga del Sur. There are four great bells at the top of Bukagan Hill. The bells were named after "St. Peter", "St. Marien", "St. Joseph" and "St. Michael" and were originally purchased by Bishop Patrick Cronin, D.D. for the Metropolitan Cathedral of the Immaculate Conception. However, the bells weigh 7 tons and were found to be too heavy and too large for the cathedral's belfry. The people felt that it was very expensive to construct a special belfry for them considering that a lot of fund raising effort was made for the building of the cathedral and the installing of the pipe organ. It was through the efforts of then City Mayor Fernando T. Bernad that the bells were finally given a place at the Bukagan Hill. With the help of Jesus Y. Varela, the huge bells were installed in Bukagan Hill Bells and officially inaugurated on July 16, 1948.
 Naomi's Botanical Garden and tourists Inn sits on a 12 hectare property of local and imported tropical flowers, plants and fruit seedlings. There are fully air-conditioned private rooms, Function halls, tennis court, Golf range, ceramics factory, pottery and a bakery inside this sprawling garden.
 Mt. Malindang Golf and Country Club is a pre-war army facility converted into a golf course located in Bagakay at the foot of Mount Malindang.
 The Immaculate Conception Pipe Organ, found in the choir loft of the Metropolitan Cathedral of the Immaculate Conception, is the only existing pipe organ in Mindanao and one among the few throughout the country. An Irish Columban priest, Father Sean Lavery, who was in charge of the liturgical and musical development in the Immaculate Conception Cathedral realized the need for an organ. Funds were raised through donations and a musical extravaganza organized by the parish raised enough money to buy the pipe organ. Father Lavery asked the help of a German priest, Father Herman Schablitzki S.V.D., who came to Ozamiz to get the specification needed to guide the organ builders in Germany. Father Schablitzki himself, assisted by one carpenter and one electrician, assembled the organ in six weeks and it was completed on May 31, 1967. It was inaugurated on July 16, 1967; the feast day of Our Lady of Mount Carmel.
 Metropolitan Cathedral of the Immaculate Conception was built from the ruins of a church destroyed in an earthquake in 1955. It was one of the early designs of national artist for architecture Leandro Locsin. His simple style of squares, circles, and half circles are evident in the external and internal designs of the church. The facade was later changed.

Transportation

Air

Ozamiz Airport, also known as Labo Airport, was reopened July 5, 2007, 9 years after Philippine Airlines (PAL) stopped their operations using Fokker 50 and Sunriser planes. This had caused the airport's closure due to its short runway, which cannot accommodate jet planes. Air Philippines, (a subsidiary airline of PAL), was the first airline that used Ninoy Aquino International Airport in Manila, using a B737-200, which is also the first jet plane to land at the airport. PAL Express, another PAL subsidiary, then made direct flights to Mactan–Cebu International Airport again using their Bombardier Q400.

PAL's competitor, Cebu Pacific Air, later opened their service in Ozamiz with its first flight to Cebu on November 10, 2008, using their brand-new ATR72-500. With high demand of passengers, cargo and tourist arrivals, Cebu Pacific then launched its Manila route with their Airbus 319, while PAL took over Air Philippines service to Manila using the Airbus 319 last June 16, 2009.

When Air Philippines took its rebranding as Airphil Express (now PAL Express), it then relaunched its Ozamiz to Manila flight last August 18, 2011, using their Airbus A320. It then forced Cebu Pacific to change its aircraft to replace all of their ATR72-500 that served Ozamiz Airport to an Airbus A319 and Airbus A320. Despite fierce competition between PAL and Cebu Pacific, PAL ended their operations in Ozamiz last March 25, 2012, leaving their affiliate PAL Express to compete with Cebu Pacific. Since then, the competition between PAL Express and Cebu Pacific became the duopoly in serving to and from the airport.

Ozamiz Airport will undergo a P300M expansion and development with installation of runway lights, extension of runway from its current of length 1.9 km to 2.1 km and construction of a new passenger terminal building.

Sea

There are several major shipping lines serving Cebu, Manila and Iligan routes namely: 2GO Travel (formerly SuperFerry, Negros Navigation and Cebu Ferries), Trans-Asia Shipping Lines, Cokaliong Shipping Lines, Carlos A. Gothong Lines, and Philippine Span Asia Carrier Corp.(PSACC former Sulpicio Lines). Cokaliong Shipping Lines increased their Cebu service from thrice to five times weekly. Local shipping lines like Daima have trips from Ozamiz to Mukas, Kolambugan, Lanao del Norte routes through Roll-on/roll-off (RORO) ferries that transport passengers, cars/trucks and goods across Panguil bay.

Land
Most transportation within the city is done by trisikad/pedicab and motorized tricycle. For interprovincial transportation, Rural Transit, Super Five, UV Express, and public utility jeepneys like Lotradisco are predominantly used.

Healthcare
Ozamiz City currently has seven hospitals and healthcare facilities:
 Mayor Hilarion A. Ramiro Sr. Medical Center (MHARS MC): a 500-bed capacity tertiary hospital owned by the Dept. of Health.
 Misamis University Medical center (MUMC): a tertiary hospital located at Barangay Bagakay.
 Medina General Hospital: a 200-bed capacity tertiary hospital located at Barangay Carmen Annex.
 Faith Hospital
 S.M. Lao Memorial Hospital
 St. Joseph General Hospital, formerly St. Mary General Hospital
 St. Padre Pio Medical Clinic - located at JEM bldg., Medina Avenue, Barangay Carmen Annex

Education
There are two universities in Ozamiz, La Salle University, formerly known as Immaculate Conception College (ICC), and Misamis University. Most students coming from Lanao del Norte, Zamboanga del Sur, Zamboanga del Norte and Misamis Occidental come to Ozamiz to pursue their college education.

 Computer Technology College 
 Immaculate Conception School of Technology (ICST) 
 La Salle University
 Lighthouse Christian Academy
 Medina College-Ozamiz
 Misamis Institute of Technology
 Misamis University
 Northwestern Mindanao Institute of Technology (NMIT)
 Northwestern Mindanao School of Technology (NMST)
 Our Lady of Triumph Institute of Technology (OLTIT)
 Ozamiz City Technology and Vocational School
 St. Constance School (SCS)
 Vocational Institute of the Philippines and Maritime Training Center

Secondary schools
The secondary schools of Ozamiz are:

 FMC MA School and Tutorial Services, Inc.
 Labinay National High School
 Labo National High School
 Misamis Union High School
 Ozamiz City National High School
 Ozamiz City School of Arts and Trades (OCSAT)
 Pulot National High School
 San Antonio National High School
 Stimpson Abordo National High School

Sister cities

Local 

Tangub
Oroquieta
Iligan
Cotabato City
Dipolog
General Santos

Cebu City
Iloilo City
Pagadian
Marawi
Cagayan de Oro

Foreign 
 Jersey City, New Jersey (1995)

See also
 List of renamed cities and municipalities in the Philippines
 Labo Airport

References

External links

 [ Philippine Standard Geographic Code]
 Ozamiz City Government
 Philippine Standard Geographic Code
 Local Governance Performance Management System

 
Cities in Misamis Occidental
Populated places established in 1757
Component cities in the Philippines
Misamis Occidental